"When You Are Gone" is a single by American country music artist Jim Reeves. Released in September 1968, it was the first single from his album A Touch of Sadness. The song peaked at number 7 on the Billboard Hot Country Singles chart. It also reached number 1 on the RPM Country Tracks chart in Canada.

Chart performance

References

1968 singles
Jim Reeves songs
Songs written by Jim Reeves
1968 songs
RCA Records singles